Toronto Blue Jays on Sportsnet is a live telecast of Toronto Blue Jays baseball games that air on Sportsnet, Sportsnet One, or Sportsnet 360. Starting in 2003, some games were broadcast in high definition. As of 2007, all games that air on the network are presented in high definition, and as of 2016, all home games are broadcast in ultra-high definition. Sportsnet began showing Blue Jays games in 1999 and is now their official television carrier, carrying all televised Blue Jays games throughout the regular season.

Non-Blue Jays games on Sportsnet are also branded as MLB on Sportsnet.

History
Sportsnet launched in October 1998 as CTV Sportsnet and began covering Blue Jays games on April 6, 1999. During the early years, Sportsnet would broadcast between 40 and 60 games. Starting in 2002, Sportsnet began broadcasting more games than TSN (The Sports Network) and took over the majority rights. Rogers Sportsnet broadcast 120 Jays games in 2003 and 2004, 103 in 2005, 122 in 2006 and 2009, 116 in 2007 and all 162 games in 2010. Games also began to air on digital channel Sportsnet One upon its launch in August 2010. Since the Blue Jays and Sportsnet are both wholly owned by Rogers Communications, Sportsnet's rights are of indefinite duration. Blue Jays games that are designated as exclusive to digital platforms (via league-wide media contracts) are the only broadcasts that are not aired on the Sportsnet channels.  

Sportsnet is also the main television outlet for Major League Baseball in Canada, holding Canadian rights to Fox's Saturday games, the All-Star Game, and the postseason. Most Sportsnet channels (including Sportsnet One) also carry a variety of non-Blue Jays games of regional interest, including the Boston Red Sox (particularly on the East and Ontario feeds) and the Seattle Mariners (on the Pacific feed), among others. Sportsnet formerly also aired ESPN's Sunday Night Baseball, but sub-licensed the games to TSN in exchange for its previous package of Blue Jays games.

On October 5, 2015, Rogers announced that it would broadcast all Blue Jays home games during the 2016 season in 4K.

Commentators

As of 2010, Blue Jays games are preceded by a pre-game show, Blue Jays Central (formerly Jays Connected), hosted by Jamie Campbell, which starts half an hour before the game. Blue Jays Central updates occur after the fourth inning and in the middle of the eighth inning. Since 2022, a Blue Jays Central update occurs after the sixth inning.

As of the 2010 season, Blue Jays games are called by Buck Martinez on play-by-play, with Pat Tabler as analyst. In September 2014, Sportsnet extended their contract with the network through 2019. Beginning in 2016, former Sunday Night Baseball commentator Dan Shulman calls play-by-play on selected games, with Martinez taking on a colour role.

Due to the structure of Rogers' MLB broadcast contracts, Sportsnet was not permitted to use its domestic production for Blue Jays games if the team is in postseason play (as it is technically still considered a regional broadcaster), and instead carried the U.S. broadcast (such as Fox in 2015, and TBS in 2016). Buck Martinez has served as a colour commentator for post-season coverage ultimately simulcast by Sportsnet, including Division Series games for TBS, and on the MLB International broadcast of the 2016 World Series.  Beginning in the 2022 season, Sportsnet is now able to broadcast Blue Jays postseason games with its own production as MLB's national Canadian rightsholder, if necessary; Dan Shulman was not available for postseason broadcasts in 2022 due to his commitments to ESPN Radio's postseason coverage, but will be stepping down in favour of Jon Sciambi in 2023 under new contracts with ESPN (which will leave him solely as the network's lead college basketball commentator).

Current
Buck Martinez: (play-by-play, alt colour on select games, 2010–present)
Dan Shulman: (play-by-play, 2016–present, select games)
Jamie Campbell: (studio host, 2010–present)
Joe Siddall: (studio analyst, 2018–present)
Hazel Mae: (field reporter, 2015–present)

Past
Alan Ashby: (analyst, 2011–2012, select games)
Rod Black: (play-by-play, 1999–2000)
Rob Faulds: (play-by-play, 2001–2004)
Jamie Campbell: (play-by-play, 2005–2009)
Joe Carter: (analyst, 1999–2000)
John Cerutti: (analyst, 2001–2004)
Tom Candiotti: (analyst, 2003, 2005, select games)
Darrin Fletcher: (analyst, 2005–2009, select games)
Rance Mulliniks: (analyst, 2005–2010)
Pat Tabler: (analyst, 2005–2022)
Sam Cosentino:  (Field Reporter, 2007–2010)

References

External links 
 
 
 

Major League Baseball on television
1999 Canadian television series debuts
1990s Canadian sports television series
2000s Canadian sports television series
2010s Canadian sports television series
Sportsnet shows
Toronto Blue Jays